This is a list of roads designated N1. Entries are sorted in alphabetical order by country.

 N1 road (Bangladesh), a road connecting Dhaka to Cox's Bazar through Chittagong
 N1 road (Belgium), a road connecting Brussels and Antwerp
 N1 Highway (Republic of Congo), a national highway connecting Point-Noire and Brazzaville
 N1 road (France), a road connecting Calais and Paris
 N1 road (Gabon), a road connecting Libreville and Tchibanga
 N1 road (Guinea), a road connecting Conakry and Nzerekore
 N1 road (Ghana), a road connecting Elubo, Cape Coast, Winneba, and Accra to Aflao
 N1 road (Ireland), a road connecting Dublin and the border with Northern Ireland
 N1 road (Mauritania), a road connecting  Bir Moghrein to Nouakchott, via Atar
 N1 road (Morocco)
 N1 highway (Niger), a road connecting Niamey, Maradi and Zinder
 N1 highway (Philippines), a primary national highway that mostly follows the route of Asian Highway 26
 N1 road (Senegal), a road connecting Dakar to Kidira and Mali
 N1 road (South Africa), a road connecting Cape Town, Johannesburg, Pretoria and the Zimbabwe border
 N1 road (Switzerland), a road connecting St. Margrethen and Geneva
 N1 highway (Nebraska), a United States road connecting Highway 34 in Elmwood and Highway 34 and Highway 75 in Murray

See also
 List of highways numbered 1